The Helyar Almshouses were erected between 1640  and 1660 by William Helyar Archdeacon of Barnstable of Coker Court, East Coker, Somerset, England.

The building work was interrupted by the plague of 1645, and the English Civil War and the almshouses were not completed until 1660, by which time, the Archdeacon was dead, and the work was completed by his grandson (also William Helyar).

In 1868 the almshouses had an income of £46 per annum. It still operates a charity and had an income of £9,313 in 2005.

References

External links

Almshouses in Somerset
Grade II listed buildings in South Somerset
Buildings and structures in South Somerset
Buildings and structures completed in 1660
Grade II listed almshouses
1660 establishments in England